

América
In
 Richard Núñez from  Cruz Azul
 Federico Higuaín from  Beşiktaş
 Sebastián Dominguez from  Estudiantes de La Plata

Out
 Duilio Davino to  FC Dallas
 Lucas Castromán to  Boca Juniors
 Santiago Fernández to  Toluca
 Ricardo Rojas to  Colo-Colo

Atlante
In
 Daniel Arismendi from  Caracas FC
 David Toledo from  UNAM
 Edwin Borboa from  Chivas

Out
 José Joel González to  Monterrey
 Fernando López to  Necaxa

Atlas
In
 Jorge Achucarro from  Cerro Porteño
 Emanuel Centurión from  Colón
 Jorge Bava from  Libertad

Out
 Juan Carlos Valenzuela to  Tecos
 Hernán Encina to  Colón
 Nicolás Olivera to  Puebla F.C.
 Aarón Padilla to  Chiapas
 Carlos Balcázar to  Chiapas
 Lucas Barrios to  Colo-Colo
 Christian Sánchez to  Chiapas

Chivas
In
 Omar Arellano from  Pachuca

Out
 Edwin Borboa to  Atlante F.C.

Cruz Azul
In
 Jaime Lozano from  Tigres
 Joaquín Beltrán from  Necaxa
 José Luis López from  UNAM
 Nicolás Vigneri from  Peñarol
 Pablo Zeballos from  Sol de América

Out
 Israel López to  Toluca
 Richard Núñez to  América
 César Delgado to  Olympique Lyonnais
 Luis Orozco to  Monarcas Morelia
 Jared Borgetti to  Monterrey

Jaguares de Chiapas
In

Out

2007–08 Primera División de México season